Zakirul Ahmed (born 8 December 1992) is a Bangladeshi cricketer from Dinajpur.

Career
Zakirul Ahmed made his List A debut in March 2022 for City Club in the 2021–22 Dhaka Premier Division Cricket League. In his second match he scored a century: 114 against Rupganj Tigers. It was the first century at List A level for City Club. In his fourth match he won the Player of the Match award for his 72 and two catches in City Club's first victory, when they beat Khelaghar Samaj Kallyan Samity by one wicket with one ball to spare on 3 April.

References

External links
 

1992 births
Living people
Bangladeshi cricketers
City Club cricketers
People from Dinajpur District, Bangladesh